Celebrity Big Brother was a special celebrity edition of the Croatian version of the international reality television franchise Big Brother. It started on 7 March 2008 and was supposed to end on 28 March 2008. The show hosted by Antonija Blaća.

Unlike the regular version of Big Brother with civilian housemates who become famous after their stay in the house, eight housemates from Croatian public life entered this show.

The Big Brother house did not change significantly different from the fourth season, except that the entrance was not in the garden, but inside the house. The patterns on the walls of the living room and bedroom were also changed. The rules of this edition were no different from the regular seasons.

Because of lack of viewers, the season was cut short by one week and it was ended on 21 March 2008. The prize was 100,000 HRK, which the winner Danijela Dvornik donated for humanitarian purposes.

Housemates

Nominations table

Notes

Reference

External link
 

2008 Croatian television seasons
Big Brother (Croatian TV series)
Celebrity Big Brother
2008 Croatian television series endings